Delta Equulei, Latinized from δ Equulei, is the second brightest star in the constellation Equuleus. Delta Equulei is a binary star system about 60 light years away, with components of class G0 and F5. Their combined magnitude is 4.47, and their absolute magnitude is 3.142. There is controversy as to the exact masses of the stars. One study puts the larger at 1.22 solar masses and the smaller at 1.17, while another pegs them at 1.66 and 1.593.  The luminosity of the larger star is calculated to be 2.23 solar, and the smaller to be 2.17.

System
William Herschel listed Delta Equulei as a wide binary. Friedrich Georg Wilhelm von Struve later showed this to be an unrelated optical double star. However his son Otto Wilhelm von Struve while making follow-up observations in 1852 found that while the separation of the optical double continued to increase, Delta Equulei itself appeared elongated. He concluded that it is a much more compact binary.

References

External links

 Delta Equulei

Spectroscopic binaries
202275
Equulei, Delta
Equuleus
G-type main-sequence stars
F-type main-sequence stars
Equulei, 07
8123
0822
Durchmusterung objects
104858